Grissell is a surname, and may refer to:

 Hartwell de la Garde Grissell (1839–1907), papal chamberlain
 Henry Grissell (1817–883), English foundryman
 Thomas Grissell (1801–1874), English public works contractor
 Wallace Grissell (1904–1954), British film director and editor